Lê Quang Quý Trang Đài, also known by the stage name Lynda Trang Đài (born October 9, 1968 in Đà Nẵng), is a Vietnamese American singer. She has appeared in many of the Paris By Night shows of Thuy Nga Productions, for example Paris By Night 36, 59, 66, 93, 94 and 100. She is noted as one of the first more provocative Vietnamese-American performers. Her racy costumes and stage antics have earned her the title "the Vietnamese Madonna," "well established but very controversial" (1999) "notoriously bold veteran" (2005). and so on.

Performance on stages 
Lynda has performed on the stage of Thuy Nga and other famous music brands

References

20th-century Vietnamese women singers
1968 births
Living people
21st-century Vietnamese women singers